Tadeusz Adam Kasprzycki (16 January 1891, Warsaw – 4 December 1978, Montreal) was a member of the Polish Legions in First World War, major general of the Polish Armed Forces from 1929 and Minister of Military Affairs of Poland from 1935 to 1939. He commanded the 12th Infantry Division from 1927 to 1931.

Biography
In 1939 he signed the Franco-Polish Military Alliance. Later, he was interned in Romania after the evacuation of the Polish government following Nazi Germany's invasion of Poland and was only released in 1945. After the end of the Second World War, he emigrated to Canada.

Kasprzycki graduated from General Paweł Chrzanowski High School in Warsaw, after which he studied social studies and law at the Sorbonne and Geneva University. In the early 1910s, he joined the Union of Active Struggle and the Riflemen's Association. Before the outbreak of World War I, he graduated from Riflemen's Officer Academy in Stróże near Limanowa.

In August 1914, Kasprzycki was named commander of the First Cadre Company. Later on, he was transferred to the headquarters of the 1st Brigade, Polish Legions. In the autumn of 1914, he joined Polish Military Organisation, helping to create its structures in the areas of Lublin and Warsaw. In 1917, Kasprzycki created the Association of Polish Military Organizations (Związek Polskich Organizacji Wojskowych).

On 3 December 1918 Kasprzycki became a member of Józef Piłsudski's office. In 1919, he went to Paris, to study at École Militaire in Paris. After returning to Poland (1921) he took several posts in the Polish Armed Forces headquarters. In March 1927, he was appointed the commander of the 19th Infantry Division (Poland), stationed in Wilno. At the same time, he was Polish delegate to the Military Commission of the League of Nations. On 1 January 1929 Kasprzycki was promoted to the rank of Brigadier general, and in July 1931, he became Deputy Minister of Military Affairs.

On 12 May 1935, after the death of Józef Piłsudski, Kasprzycki was named Minister of Military Affairs by the President of Poland and remained in this post until 30 September 1939. On 19 March 1936 he was promoted to Divisional general.

Apart from military activities, Kasprzycki was a member of several civilian organizations. In 1936, he was appointed the chairman of Main Committee of Mountain Congress, which took place in August of that year in Sanok. In December 1937, he was named chairman of Polish Association of Research Expeditions, and due to his efforts, a road along the ridge of Gubałówka was built. Furthermore, he was a member of the Association of Development of Eastern Provinces.

In the spring of 1939, Kasprzycki's wife Maria née Strychalska committed suicide, and his son, who at that time was a high school student, broke all relations with the father. The probable cause of these events was Kasprzycki's affair with actress Zofia Kajzerówna.

During the Polish September Campaign, Kasprzycki, together with the government of Poland, was evacuated to Romania, where he was interned. In 1944 he arrived in Great Britain via Turkey. He wanted to join Polish Armed Forces in the West, but his application was rejected by Władysław Sikorski, who claimed that Kasprzycki was one of the people directly responsible for Polish defeat in September 1939. In 1954 he moved to Canada.

Honours and awards
 Silver Cross of the Order of Virtuti Militari
 Cross of Independence
 Commander's Cross of the Order of Polonia Restituta
 Cross of Valour - three times
 Gold Cross of Merit
 Mark officers "Parasol"
 Order of the Cross of the Eagle, Class I (Estonia, 1938)
 Order of Saint Sava

Further reading
 Andrzej Ajnenkiel, "Polsko-francuski sojusz wojskowy". Akademia Obrony Narodowej, Warsaw, 2000.
 John P. Dunn, Polish Defense Planning, 1919-1939: MYTH VS. REALITY, 1987, dissertation, FLORIDA ATLANTIC UNIVERSITY,  
Dziennik Personalny M.S.Wojsk. Nr 14 z 22.12.1934 r.
Tadeusz Kasprzycki, Kartki z dziennika oficera I. brygady, Warszawa. 1934.
 Stanley S. Seidner, Marshal Edward Śmigły-Rydz Rydz and the Defense of Poland, New York, 1978.

External links
Generals.dk

References

1891 births
1978 deaths
Military personnel from Warsaw
People from Warsaw Governorate
Polish generals of the Second Polish Republic
Polish Military Organisation members
Polish legionnaires (World War I)
Polish emigrants to Canada
Military operations involving Poland
Invasion of Poland
Recipients of the Order of St. Sava
Recipients of the Silver Cross of the Virtuti Militari
Recipients of the Cross of Independence
Commanders of the Order of Polonia Restituta
Recipients of the Cross of Valour (Poland)
Recipients of the Gold Cross of Merit (Poland)
Recipients of the Military Order of the Cross of the Eagle, Class I